The 102nd Cavalry Regiment is a regiment of the United States Army first established in 1913 and which saw service in World War II.

History
The regiment was designated as the 102nd Cavalry on 17 August 1921 from the 1st New Jersey Cavalry Regiment and had its headquarters in Newark. The regiment was initially assigned to the 21st Cavalry Division. It was re-designated as the 102d Cavalry Regiment (Horse and Mechanized) on 16 November 1940. The regiment was inducted into federal service in January 1941 and reorganized in 1943 and 1944. The 1st Squadron was redesignated the 102nd Cavalry Reconnaissance Squadron (Mechanized) while the 2nd Squadron became the 117th Cavalry Reconnaissance Squadron (Mechanized). The regimental headquarters troop became the headquarters of the 102nd Cavalry Group (Mechanized) on 2 January 1944 in Exeter, England.  With the 38th and 102nd Cavalry Reconnaissance Squadrons under its command, the group saw combat in northwest Europe during World War II with the V Corps. The group fought in the Normandy, Northern France, Rhineland, Ardennes-Alsace, and Central Europe campaigns. Following the war, the 102nd Group was inactivated on 22 October 1945 at Camp Myles Standish, Massachusetts. The 117th Cavalry Reconnaissance Squadron was shipped to Algeria and later fought in Italy, southern France, Alsace, and Germany.

Following a series of postwar reorganizations and a period in which the unit was known as the 102nd Armor Regiment, the unit was consolidated with the 117th Cavalry Regiment on 1 August 2008 and designated the 102nd Cavalry Regiment, with a strength of one squadron that is subordinated to the 50th Infantry Brigade Combat Team.

The 1st New Jersey Cavalry Regiment had existed previously during the American Civil War, but the lineage of that incarnation of the unit was not officially carried over, apparently due to the lapse in a regimental structure between 1865 and 1913.

CAMPAIGN PARTICIPATION

World War I

Meuse-Argonne
Alsace 1918

World War II

Rome-Arno
Normandy (with arrowhead)
Northern France
Southern France (with arrowhead)
Rhineland
Ardennes-Alsace
Central Europe

War on Terrorism

Iraq:Iraqi Surge

Troop C, 1st Squadron (Hackettstown), additionally entitled to:
War on Terrorism
Iraq: National Resolution

DECORATIONS

French Croix de Guerre with Palm, World War II, Streamer embroidered BEACHES OF NORMANDY

French Croix de Guerre with Palm, World War II, Streamer embroidered PROVENCE TO LORRAINE

Troop B (West Orange), 1st Squadron, additionally entitled to:
World War II
Asiatic-Pacific Theater, Streamer without inscription

Troop A (Dover), 1st Squadron, additionally entitled to:

Meritorious Unit Commendation (Army), Streamer embroidered IRAQ SEP 2008-MAY 2009

Lineage

Organized 29 May 1913 in the New Jersey National Guard as the 1st Cavalry Squadron with headquarters at Newark

Mustered into federal service 21 June 1916 at Sea Girt; mustered out of federal service 21 October 1916 at Newark

Mustered into federal service 28 July 1917 at Sea Girt; drafted into federal service
5 August 1917

Squadron broken up 15 September 1917 and its elements reorganized and redesignated as follows:

Squadron (less Troops B and D) reorganized and redesignated as the 104th Train Headquarters and Military Police, an element of the 29th Division

Troops B and D, 1st Cavalry Squadron, consolidated to form Battery F, 110th Field Artillery, an element of the 29th Division

After 15 September 1917 the above units underwent changes as follows:

104th Train Headquarters and Military Police (less Company B), reorganized and redesignated 1 November 1918 as the 29th Military Police Company, an element of the 29th Division
Demobilized 30 May 1919 at Camp Dix, New Jersey

Company B, 104th Train Headquarters and Military Police, reorganized and redesignated 29 October 1918 as Company C, First Army Military Police Battalion, and relieved from assignment to the 29th Division
Redesignated 15 March 1919 as the 216th Company, Military Police Corps
Demobilized 14 July 1919 at Camp Dodge, Iowa

Battery F, 110th Field Artillery, redesignated 27 November 1917 as Battery F, 112th Field Artillery, an element of the 29th Division
Demobilized 31 May 1919 at Camp Dix, New Jersey

Former 1st Cavalry Squadron reorganized 1919-1920 in the New Jersey National Guard; Headquarters federally recognized 29 September 1920 at Newark

Expanded, reorganized, and redesignated 1 March 1921 as the 1st Cavalry, with headquarters at Newark

Reorganized and redesignated 17 August 1921 as the 102d Cavalry

Assigned in June 1937 to the 21st Cavalry Division

Relieved 16 November 1940 from assignment to the 21st Cavalry Division

Inducted into federal service 6 January 1941 at home stations

2d Squadron withdrawn 30 November 1943, reorganized, and redesignated as the 117th Cavalry Reconnaissance Squadron, Mechanized (1st Squadron – see ANNEX 1 [remainder of 102d Cavalry—hereafter separate lineages])

117th Cavalry Reconnaissance Squadron, Mechanized, inactivated 25 November 1945 in Germany

Reorganized and federally recognized 20 November 1946 at West Orange as the 117th Cavalry Reconnaissance Squadron

Reorganized and redesignated 1 November 1949 as the 2d Battalion, 102d Armored Cavalry

Consolidated 1 February 1968 with the 6th Battalion, 50th Armor (see ANNEX 2), and consolidated unit reorganized and redesignated as the 102d Armor, a parent regiment under the Combat Arms Regimental System, to consist of the 1st and 2d Battalions

Consolidated 1 December 1971 with the 50th Armor (see ANNEXES 3, 4, and 5) and consolidated unit designated as the 102d Armor to consist of the 1st and 2d Battalions and the 3d, 4th, and 5th Battalions, elements of the 50th Armored Division

Reorganized 1 July 1975 to consist of the 1st, 2d, 3d, and 5th Battalions, elements of the 50th Armored Division

Withdrawn 1 June 1989 from the Combat Arms Regimental System and reorganized under the United States Army Regimental System

Reorganized 1 September 1991 to consist of the 2d and 3d Battalions, elements of the 50th Armored Division

Reorganized 1 September 1993 to consist of the 2d and 3d Battalions, elements of the 42d Infantry Division

Reorganized 1 September 1994 to consist of the 2d Battalion, an element of the 42d Infantry Division

Ordered into active federal service 12 – 27 April 2004 at home stations; released from active federal service 11 – 26 April 2005 and reverted to state control

Redesignated 1 October 2005 as the 102d Armored Regiment

(Ordered into active federal service 16 June 2008 at home stations)

Consolidated 1 September 2008 with the 117th Cavalry Regiment (see ANNEX 1) and consolidated unit designated as the 102d Cavalry Regiment, to consist of the 1st Squadron, an element of the 50th Infantry Brigade Combat Team

Released from active federal service 20 July 2009 and reverted to state control

ANNEX 1
Organized and federally recognized 29 April 1921 in the New Jersey National Guard from new and existing elements as the 1st Squadron, 1st Cavalry, with headquarters at Newark
(1st Cavalry redesignated 17 August 1921 as the 102d Cavalry)
Assigned in June 1937 to the 21st Cavalry Division
Relieved 16 November 1940 from assignment to the 21st Cavalry Division
Inducted into federal service 6 January 1941 at home stations
Reorganized, and redesignated 2 January 1944 as the 102d Cavalry Reconnaissance Squadron, Mechanized (remainder of 102d Cavalry—hereafter separate lineage)
Inactivated 23 October 1945 at Camp Shanks, New York
Westfield elements reorganized and federally recognized 26 September 1946 as the 50th Cavalry Reconnaissance Squadron, with headquarters at Westfield, and assigned to the 50th Armored Division (remainder of 102d Cavalry Reconnaissance Squadron, Mechanized—hereafter separate lineage)
Redesignated in 1947 as the 50th Mechanized Cavalry Reconnaissance Squadron
Reorganized and redesignated 1 March 1949 as the 50th Reconnaissance Battalion
Reorganized and redesignated 1 March 1959 as the 5th Reconnaissance Squadron, 50th Armor, an element of the 50th Armored Division
Reorganized and redesignated 31 January 1963 as the 117th Cavalry, a parent regiment under the Combat Arms Regimental System, to consist of the 5th Squadron, an element of the 50th Armored Division
(Troop B allotted 1 February 1968 to the New York Army National Guard; withdrawn 1 April 1975 from the New York Army National Guard; allotted 1 July 1975 to the New Jersey Army National Guard.  Troop C allotted 1 February 1968 to the Vermont Army National Guard; withdrawn 16 October 1984 from the Vermont Army National Guard; allotted 2 October 1986 to the New Jersey Army National Guard)
Withdrawn 1 June 1989 from the Combat Arms Regimental System and reorganized under the United States Army Regimental System
Reorganized 1 September 1993 to consist of the 5th Squadron, an element of the 42d Infantry Division
Redesignated 1 October 2005 as the 117th Cavalry Regiment
Ordered into active federal service 16 June 2008 at home stations

ANNEX 2

Organized and federally recognized 13 February 1951 in the New Jersey Army National Guard as the 3d Battalion, 102d Armored Cavalry, with headquarters at Phillipsburg

Reorganized and redesignated 1 May 1954 as the 250th Tank Battalion

Reorganized and redesignated 1 March 1959 as the 2d Medium Tank Battalion, 53d Armor

Redesignated 31 January 1963 as the 2d Battalion, 53d Armor

Redesignated 15 April 1964 as the 6th Battalion, 50th Armor

ANNEX 3

Organized and federally recognized 16 June 1937 in the New Jersey National Guard from existing units as the 3d Battalion, 157th Field Artillery, an element of the 44th Division (later redesignated as the 44th Infantry Division), with headquarters at Vineland

Inducted into federal service 16 September 1940 at home stations

Redesignated 7 January 1941 as the 2d Battalion, 157th Field Artillery Regiment

Reorganized and redesignated 20 February 1942 as the 157th Field Artillery

Inactivated 12 November 1945 at Camp Chaffee, Arkansas, and relieved from assignment to the 44th Infantry Division

Converted and redesignated 5 July 1946 as the 114th Tank Battalion and assigned to the 50th Armored Division

Reorganized and federally recognized 21 November 1946 with headquarters at Vineland

Redesignated 1 March 1949 as the 114th Medium Tank Battalion

Redesignated 1 December 1952 as the 114th Tank Battalion

Consolidated 1 March 1959 with the 644th Tank Battalion (see ANNEX 4), 113th Tank Battalion (see ANNEX 5), 215th Tank Battalion (organized and federally recognized 11 April 1947 with headquarters at Dumont), and the 50th Reconnaissance Battalion (organized and federally recognized 26 September 1946 from existing units with headquarters at Westfield) and consolidated unit reorganized and redesignated as the 50th Armor, a parent regiment under the Combat Arms Regimental System, to consist of the 1st, 2d, 3d, and 4th Medium Tank Battalions and the 5th Reconnaissance Squadron, elements of the 50th Armored Division

Reorganized 31 January 1963 to consist of the 1st, 2d, 3d, 4th, and 6th Battalions, elements of the 50th Armored Division (5th Reconnaissance Squadron [formerly the 50th Reconnaissance Battalion] concurrently withdrawn, reorganized, and redesignated as the 117th Cavalry – see ANNEX 1)

Reorganized 1 February 1968 to consist of the 1st, 2d, and 3d Battalions, elements of the 50th Armored Division (4th Battalion [formerly the 215th Tank Battalion] reorganized and redesignated as the 3d Squadron, 104th Armored Cavalry—hereafter separate lineage)

ANNEX 4

Constituted 3 December 1941 in the Army of the United States as the 644th Tank Destroyer Battalion, Light

Organized 15 December 1941 at Fort Dix, New Jersey, from the Anti-tank Battalion (Provisional) of the 44th Division (organized 1 July 1941 at Fort Dix, New Jersey)

Allotted 13 March 1942 to the New Jersey National Guard

Inactivated 5 December 1945 at Camp Patrick Henry, Virginia

Reorganized and federally recognized 18 November 1946 in eastern New Jersey as the 644th Tank Battalion with headquarters at Red Bank

Redesignated 1 March 1949 as the 644th Heavy Tank Battalion and assigned to the 50th Armored Division

Redesignated 1 December 1952 as the 644th Tank Battalion

ANNEX 5

Constituted 9 July 1946 in the New Jersey National Guard as the 113th Tank Battalion and assigned to the 50th Armored Division

Organized and federally recognized 8 April 1947 in eastern New Jersey with headquarters at Orange

(Location of headquarters changed 31 December 1947 to Dover)

Redesignated 1 March 1949 as the 113th Medium Tank Battalion

Redesignated 1 December 1952 as the 113th Tank Battalion

Distinctive unit insignia
 Description
A Gold color metal and enamel device 1 1/8 inches (2.86 cm) in height overall blazoned: SHIELD: Per chevron enhanced Azure an Or, on the first two fleurs-de-lis of the second, in base a horse's head erased of the first. CREST: On a wreath of the colors Or and Azure, a lion's head Or collared four fusils Gules. Attached below and to the sides of the shield a Gold scroll inscribed "SHOW ‘EM THE WAY" in Red.
 Symbolism
SHIELD: The division of the shield per chevron alludes to the assault on the Normandy Beach. The two fleurs-de-lis represent service in Europe during World Wars I and II. The horse's head is from the historic crest of the Essex Troop. CREST: The crest is that of the New Jersey Army National Guard.
 Background
The distinctive unit insignia was originally approved for the 117th Cavalry Regiment on 20 November 1964. It was amended to revise the symbolism on 23 February 1972. The insignia was redesignated effective 1 September 2008, for the 102d Cavalry Regiment with the description updated.

Coat of arms
Blazon
 Shield: Per chevron enhanced Azure and Or, on the first two fleurs-de-lis of the second, in base a horse's head erased of the first.
 Crest: That for the regiments and separate battalions of the New Jersey Army National Guard: From a wreath Or and Azure, a lion's head erased Or collared four fusils Gules.
 Motto: SHOW ‘EM THE WAY.
 Symbolism
 Shield: The division of the shield per chevron alludes to the assault on the Normandy Beach. The two fleurs-de-lis represent service in Europe during World Wars I and II. The horse's head is from the historic crest of the Essex Troop.
 Background: The coat of arms was originally approved for the 117th Cavalry Regiment on 20 November 1964. It was amended to revise the symbolism on 23 February 1972. The insignia was redesignated effective 1 September 2008, for the 102d Cavalry Regiment

Current configuration
 1st Squadron 102nd Cavalry Regiment (United States) Serves as the Reconnaissance Surveillance and Target Acquisition (RSTA) Squadron for the 50th IBCT, 42nd Infantry Division, NY
 Headquarters and Headquarters Troop (HHT), Westfield, NJ
 A Troop (Mounted), Dover, NJ
 B Troop (Mounted), West Orange, NJ
 C Troop (Dismounted), Hackettstown, NJ
 D Company, 250th Brigade Support Battalion (D-250th BSB) (Forward Support Company), Westfield, NJ
 2nd Squadron 102nd Cavalry Regiment (United States) INACTIVE
 3rd Squadron 102nd Cavalry Regiment (United States) INACTIVE
 4th Squadron 102nd Cavalry Regiment (United States) INACTIVE

See also
 List of armored and cavalry regiments of the United States Army
 Rhino tank

References

 Clay, Steven E., U.S. Army Order of Battle 1919-1941 (Vol. 2), Fort Leavenworth: Combat Studies Institute Press, 2010.
 Stanton, Shelby, U.S. Army Order of Battle in World War II, New York: Galahad Books, 1994.
 Pope, Jeffrey L. and Kondratiuk, Leonid E., Armor-Cavalry Regiments, Washington: National Guard Bureau, 1995.
 Historical register and dictionary of the United States Army, from ..., Volume 1 By Francis Bernard Heitman 
 Encyclopedia of United States Army insignia and uniforms By William K. Emerson (page 51).

External links
 https://web.archive.org/web/20110513005759/http://www.history.army.mil/html/forcestruc/lineages/branches/ar/default.htm
 https://web.archive.org/web/20110513005804/http://www.history.army.mil/html/forcestruc/lineages/branches/cav/default.htm
 http://117th-cav.org/History%20of%20the%20102nd.pdf 
 https://web.archive.org/web/20130219021017/http://www.essextroop.org/

102
Military units and formations established in 1913
1913 establishments in New Jersey
New Jersey National Guard